Administrative Staff College of India (ASCI), was started jointly by the Government of India and the representatives of industry as an autonomous institute in the year 1956 to impart training in the field of Civil Services development. It is located at the palace of the erstwhile Prince of Berar known as Bella Vista at Hyderabad who was heir apparent to the (throne) of Hyderabad.

Initially Government Of India envisaged to set up the college in Britain. The first session was to commence in 1948 at Henley. However a committee of the All India Council for Technical Education in 1953 recommended that the Administrative Staff College be established in India. ASCI specialises in training of civil servants of corporate and government sectors and urban management. The research and consultancy activities of ASCI were started in 1973 with aid from Ford Foundation. An IAS officer of 1976 batch, R. H. Khwaja took charge as ASCI DG on January 1, 2017

See also
 List of business schools in Hyderabad, India

References

External links 
 

Heritage structures in Hyderabad, India
Business schools in Hyderabad, India
Educational institutions established in 1956
1956 establishments in Andhra Pradesh